Samsung Galaxy J7+ is a mid range Android smartphone produced by Samsung Electronics in 2017. It is also known as Samsung Galaxy C7 (2017) and Samsung Galaxy C8. It was unveiled on 2 September 2017.

Specifications

Design 
Samsung Galaxy J7+ has a 5.5 inch display and a metal unibody design. There is a Home button with a built-in fingerprint scanner and two capacitive buttons (recent apps and menu buttons) on the lower bezel of the display while there is a "Samsung" logo, a front-facing camera. an LED flash and sensors on the upper bezel of the display. 

At the back panel, there is dual camera setup alongside the "Samsung" logo and the antenna lines. On the side frame; there is a headphone jack, a microUSB port and a microphone at the bottom, there is a volume rocker and a microSIM/microSD card tray at the left, and there is a power button and a speaker at the right. 

Galaxy J7+ measures 152.4 x 74.7 x 7.9 mm and weighs 180 grams. It is available in black and gold.

Hardware
Samsung Galaxy J7+ has a dual rear camera setup with a 13 MP camera with f/1.7 aperture and a 5 MP depth sensor with f/1.9 aperture. The device has a 16 MP front-facing camera with f/1.9 aperture. Both the dual rear camera setup and the front-facing camera are assisted by LED flash. The depth sensor enables the Live Focus feature. 

Galaxy J7+ has a 5.5 inch Super AMOLED display with 1080x1920 pixels resolution. It has 4 GB RAM and 32 GB internal storage that is expandable up to 256 GB by using a microSD card. It has a 3000 mAh non-removable battery.

Software 
Samsung Galaxy J7+ comes with Android 7.1 Nougat and Samsung Experience user interface. Biometric options include the fingerprint scanner and software-based facial recognition. The software also has Always-on-Display and Bixby Home.

References

External links 
Official website

Galaxy J7+
Samsung smartphones
Android (operating system) devices
Mobile phones introduced in 2017
Discontinued smartphones